Anna Augusta Truitt (Pattin; after first marriage, Ramsey; after second marriage, Truitt; 1837 – June 9, 1920) was an American philanthropist, temperance reformer, and essayist. For many years, she provided services for the Woman's Christian Temperance Union (WCTU), acting as delegate from the local to the district, state and national conventions. Her essays, addresses and reports showed her to be a talented writer. Benevolence was said to be her one underlying character trait.

Early life and education
Anna Augusta Pattin was born in Canaan, New Hampshire, in 1837. Her father was Daniel G. Pattin. Her mother, Ruth Chase Whittier, was related to Governor Salmon P. Chase and the poet John Greenleaf Whittier.

At an early age, her father emigrated to Upstate New York, where she was educated by private tutors. She subsequently spent two years in College Hills Seminary.

Career
She married John P. Ramsey in 1860. They settled in the South, where they resided until the American Civil War, when, on account of diametrical differences of opinion between themselves and the inhabitants, they returned to the North, but at a large sacrifice of personal and other property. Here, in 1864, Mr. Ramsey died. 

On May 17, 1864, in Mansfield, Ohio, she married Joshua Truitt (1830–1894), a businessman of Muncie, Indiana. He brought with him two children, Lola and Stanley, his first wife having died the previous December. The family made their home in Muncie, where Truitt became actively engaged in benevolent and philanthropic work. During the Civil War, she was untiring in her labors in behalf of the Union Army, preparing bandages and scraping lint for the use of the surgeons, and collecting provisions, clothing, blankets, and hundreds of other things useful and needful to the soldiers. She marched, sang and prayed with them.

After the war, she became engaged in the work of the WCTU. She served as president of the Delaware County, Indiana WCTU for several years, and was selected by the Union to represent them in state and district meetings, as well as in the national convention in Tennessee in November 1887. She was the Indiana temperance delegate to the International Sunday School Convention held at Pittsburgh, Pennsylvania, in June 1890, and her report of its proceedings was accepted without alteration or amendment, which spoke well for her accuracy, lucidity, and logical trend of thought. In the WCTU, she adhered to the principle of nonpartisan, nonsectarian work. In a blue-ribbon temperance club, she was an untiring worker and spared neither time, effort nor means in advancing its interests. She was also an advocate of suffrage, believing that woman's vote would go far towards the cause of temperance.

For years, she was identified with the industrial school of Muncie, serving as an officer, as well as performing duties in its meetings and those pertaining to the executive department. Her presence was familiar in the homes of the poor, carrying sympathy, counsel and needed food and clothing. In this connection, there was probably no other one woman in Muncie known to more children than Truitt, who was constantly performing for them some work of kindness.

Personal life
She had no children of her own, but she took into her family the four children of her deceased brother, taking on the role of their mother.
 For many years, Truitt was an attendant of the Presbyterian church. She died June 9, 1920, and was buried at Beech Grove Cemetery, in Muncie.

References

Attribution

Bibliography

External links

 
 

1837 births
1920 deaths
19th-century American essayists
19th-century American women writers
People from Canaan, New Hampshire
People from Muncie, Indiana
Woman's Christian Temperance Union people
19th-century American philanthropists
American temperance activists
American essayists
American women essayists
Wikipedia articles incorporating text from A Woman of the Century
20th-century American essayists
20th-century American women writers
American women philanthropists
People from New York (state)
Union Army civilians
American suffragists
American Presbyterians
19th-century women philanthropists